Guilherme Henrique Cobbo (born 1 October 1987 in Uraí) is a Brazilian athlete competing in the high jump. He competed at the 2012 Summer Olympics.

Competition record

References

External links
 

1987 births
Living people
Brazilian male high jumpers
Athletes (track and field) at the 2012 Summer Olympics
Olympic athletes of Brazil
Sportspeople from Paraná (state)
21st-century Brazilian people
20th-century Brazilian people